Åsa Svensson and Meilen Tu were the defending champions, but Svensson was no longer active in the WTA Tour, having played her last professional match in October 2004. Tu partnered with Teryn Ashley and lost in first round to Yuliya Beygelzimer and Alina Jidkova.

Miho Saeki and Yuka Yoshida won the title by defeating Laura Granville and Abigail Spears 6–3, 6–4 in the final.

Seeds

Draw

Draw

References
 Main and Qualifying Rounds

Cellular South Cup - Doubles
U.S. National Indoor Championships